was a town located in Ochi District, Ehime Prefecture, Japan.

The municipality consisted of the four inhabited islands of Yugeshima, Sashima, Teshima, and Hyakkanjima. The town office was located in Yugeshima (now Kamishima Town Hall).

Yugeshima Village was established with the creation of the modern municipalities system on December 15, 1889. On September 1895, Uoshima became a separate village. Yuge was elevated to town status on January 1, 1953.

As of 2003, the town had an estimated population of 3,683 and a density of 312.91 persons per km2. The total area was 11.77 km2.

On October 1, 2004, Yuge, along with the villages of Ikina, Iwagi and Uoshima (all from Ochi District), was merged to create the town of Kamijima and no longer exists as an independent municipality.

External links
Official website of Kamijima in Japanese

Dissolved municipalities of Ehime Prefecture
Kamijima, Ehime